Group I of the 2017 Africa Cup of Nations qualification tournament was one of the thirteen groups to decide the teams which qualified for the 2017 Africa Cup of Nations finals tournament. The group consisted of three teams: Ivory Coast, Sudan, and Sierra Leone. The hosts of the final tournament, Gabon, had also been drawn into this group and played games against the other three teams in the group; however, these matches were only considered as friendlies and not counted for the standings.

The teams played against each other home-and-away in a round-robin format, between June 2015 and September 2016.

Ivory Coast, the group winners, qualified for the 2017 Africa Cup of Nations. Since this group only had three teams, the runners-up were not eligible to qualify as one of the two group runners-up with the best records.

Standings

Matches

Centralised friendlies

Goalscorers
1 goal

 Gervinho
 Max Gradel
 Jonathan Kodjia
 Shéka Fofana
 Kei Kamara
 Ramadan Alagab
 Muhannad El Tahir

Notes

References

External links
Orange Africa Cup Of Nations Qualifiers 2017, CAFonline.com

Group I